This list is for St. John the Evangelist Cathedrals.  For St. John the Baptist Cathedrals, see St. John the Baptist Cathedral (disambiguation)

St. John's Cathedral, St. John Cathedral, or Cathedral of St. John, or other variations on the name, with or without the suffix 'the Evangelist', may refer to:

Antigua
St. John's Cathedral (Antigua and Barbuda)

Australia
St John's Cathedral (Brisbane), in Queensland
St John's Cathedral, Parramatta, in Sydney, New South Wales

Belize
St. John's Cathedral (Belize City)

Canada

St. John Cathedral (Edmonton), Alberta
Cathedral of St. John (Winnipeg), Manitoba
St. John's Cathedral (Toronto), Ontario
Cathedral of St. John the Evangelist (Saskatoon), Saskatchewan

China 
St John's Cathedral, Langzhong

Cyprus
St. John's Cathedral, Nicosia

France
Besançon Cathedral (Cathédrale Saint-Jean de Besançon)

Hong Kong
St John's Cathedral (Hong Kong)

Hungary
Cathedral Basilica of St. John the Apostle, Eger

India
St. John's Cathedral, Tiruvalla

Ireland
St John's Cathedral (Limerick)

Malaysia
St. John's Cathedral (Kuala Lumpur)

Malta
Saint John's Co-Cathedral, Valletta

Netherlands
St. John's Cathedral ('s-Hertogenbosch)

Philippines
Dagupan Cathedral, Pangasinan

Poland
St. John's Archcathedral, Warsaw
Wrocław Cathedral (Cathedral of St. John the Baptist in Wrocław)

South Africa
St John's Cathedral, Mthatha

Taiwan
St. John's Cathedral (Chiayi)
St. John's Cathedral (Taipei)

Turkey
St. John's Cathedral (Izmir)

United Kingdom
St John's Cathedral, Oban, Scotland  
Cathedral of St John the Evangelist, Portsmouth

United States
(by state then city)
St. John's Cathedral (Los Angeles), California
St. John Cathedral (Fresno, California)
Cathedral of St. John in the Wilderness, Denver, Colorado
Cathedral Church of St. John (Wilmington, Delaware)
St. John's Cathedral (Jacksonville), Florida
Cathedral of St. John the Evangelist (Boise, Idaho), listed on the NRHP
St. John's Cathedral (Lafayette, Louisiana), listed on the NRHP
Cathedral of St. John the Divine, New York City
Cathedral Church of St. John (Albuquerque, New Mexico)
Cathedral of St. John the Evangelist (Cleveland, Ohio)
Cathedral of St. John (Providence, Rhode Island)
St. John's Cathedral (Knoxville, Tennessee)
Cathedral of St. John the Evangelist (Spokane, Washington)
Cathedral of St. John the Evangelist (Milwaukee), Wisconsin

See also
St. John the Baptist Cathedral (disambiguation)
San Juan Cathedral (disambiguation)